Richard William Saunders (8 August 1913 – 14 February 1978) was an Australian rules footballer who played with Richmond and Fitzroy in the Victorian Football League (VFL).

Saunders, originally a Brunswick junior, played two seasons at Richmond. In both seasons, Richmond made the grand final, but Saunders didn't feature in either finals series. He won the 1934 Gardiner Medal, for his performances in the seconds. He crossed over to Fitzroy in 1935 and played 13 games that year and a further three in 1936.

Family 
Saunders was the son of Ern Saunders, who played VFA football for Collingwood and South Melbourne Football Clubs before serving as head trainer of University and Richmond football clubs.

References

External links

1913 births
1978 deaths
Australian rules footballers from Melbourne
Richmond Football Club players
Fitzroy Football Club players
People from Brunswick, Victoria